Winfried Nöth (born September 12, 1944 in Gerolzhofen) is a German linguist and semiotician.

After graduating from high school in 1963 in Brunswick, from 1965 to 1969 Nöth studied English, French and Portuguese in Münster, Geneva, Lisbon and Bochum, and in 1971 acquired his doctoral degrees at the Ruhr University Bochum. In Bochum he also habilitated in 1976 and became assistant to Walter A. Koch. After teaching in Bochum and Aachen, in 1978 he was appointed full professor in English Linguistics at the University of Kassel.

In 1985 Nöth was visiting professor at the University of Wisconsin–Green Bay in Green Bay, Wisconsin, United States, and in 1994 at the Pontifícia Universidade Católica de São Paulo in Brazil. Since 1999 he has been Director of the Scientific Centre for Cultural Research, University of Kassel, and President of the German Society for Semiotics. His Handbook of Semiotics (first published 1985) gives a comprehensive overview of the history and various orientations of semiotics and presents the most important representatives.

Selected publications 
 Winfried Nöth: Strukturen des Happenings. Olms, Hildesheim/New York 1972
 Winfried Nöth: Semiotik: Eine Einführung mit Beispielen für Reklameanalysen. Niemeyer, Tübingen 1975 
 Winfried Nöth: Dynamik semiotischer Systeme: Vom altenglischen Zauberspruch zum illustrierten Werbetext. Metzler, Stuttgart 1977.
 Winfried Nöth: Literatursemiotische Analysen – zu Lewis Carrolls Alice-Büchern. Narr, Tübingen 1980 
 Winfried Nöth: Handbuch der Semiotik. 2., vollständig neu bearbeitete Auflage. Metzler, Stuttgart/Weimar 2000 
 Winfried Nöth/Nina Bishara/Britta Neitzel: Mediale Selbstreferenz: Grundlagen und Fallstudien zu Werbung, Computerspiel und Comics. Halem, Köln 2008.

External links 
  (Home page)
 

1944 births
Living people
Linguists from Germany
German semioticians
People from Gerolzhofen